The Houston–SMU men's basketball rivalry is a college rivalry between the University of Houston Cougars and Southern Methodist University Mustangs. When Houston joined the Southwest Conference in 1972, the two schools were conference mates until the conference dissolved in 1996. After a brief hiatus, SMU would join Conference USA in 2005 and the rivalry would continue when both schools moved to the American Athletic Conference in the midst of 2010–2014 NCAA conference realignment. Later, with Houston's move to the Big 12 Conference as a result of 2021–22 NCAA conference realignment, the future of the rivalry was put in doubt.

Series history 

Houston and SMU would meet three times in the NCAA Tournament before playing in a regular season game, first in 1972. Throughout their shared time in the Southwest Conference, the Cougars and Mustangs would meet seven times in the Southwest Conference men's basketball tournament, with SMU leading 4–3 in their meetings then. The teams have also been conference mates in Conference USA and the American Athletic Conference, meeting once each in the tournaments for each conference. As of the end of the 2022–23 season, Houston led the all-time series 58–34.

Notable games 
March 16, 1956: In the teams' first ever meeting, they first played at Allen Fieldhouse in the 1956 NCAA Sweet Sixteen. All–American Jim Krebs would score 27 points to lead the No. 7 Mustangs to victory 89–74 and an eventual Final Four.

March 13, 1965: In the teams' second meeting, Houston and SMU met to play in the 1965 NCAA Regional third place Game. Behind the 27 points of Carroll Hooser, the Mustangs would again pull out a win against the Cougars, 89–87.

March 18, 1967: In the third meeting in the NCAA Tournament, a Final Four was on the line as the teams met in the 1967 NCAA Elite Eight. This time, fortune would favor the Cougars. Led by 31 points from Elvin Hayes, Houston would gain their first series win by a score of 83–75.

January 16, 1982: In the first year of Phi Slama Jama, SMU visited No. 10 Houston and upset the Cougars 67–66. Houston would go onto the 1982 Final Four, while SMU had a 6–21 record.

March 12, 1983: After beating the Mustangs twice in the regular season, Houston would meet SMU once again in the 1983 Southwest Conference men's basketball tournament semifinals. Houston would maintain their streak against SMU, winning 75–59. Houston would win the Conference tournament and make an NCAA run before finally losing to North Carolina State in the 1983 NCAA Finals.

March 3, 1985: The days of Phi Slama Jama behind them, the tables turned in favor of SMU with the Mustangs beating No. 11 Oklahoma and No. 5 North Carolina during the 1984-85 season. The No. 13 Mustangs headed to Houston for the final regular season game, only to be handed a 79–76 upset loss.

February 1, 2016: No. 12 SMU seemed to be heading in the right direction under the leadership of coach Larry Brown, visiting the Cougars with a 19–1 record on the season and having beaten the Cougars already on the season. Coach Kelvin Sampson would earn his first win against SMU, when the Cougars pulled the upset to win 71–68. It was the Cougars' biggest victory since January 1996, when they defeated No. 3 Memphis.

Game results 
Rankings are from the AP Poll released prior to the game.

Notes 
A 1956 NCAA basketball tournament
B 1965 NCAA University Division basketball tournament
C 1967 NCAA University Division basketball tournament
D 1979 Southwest Conference men's basketball tournament
E 1983 Southwest Conference men's basketball tournament
F 1985 Southwest Conference men's basketball tournament
G 1988 Southwest Conference men's basketball tournament
H 1991 Southwest Conference men's basketball tournament
I 1992 Southwest Conference men's basketball tournament
J 1996 Southwest Conference men's basketball tournament
K 2009 Conference USA men's basketball tournament
L 2014 American Athletic Conference men's basketball tournament

Wins by location

Wins by venue

References

Houston Cougars men's basketball
SMU Mustangs men's basketball
1956 establishments in Texas
College basketball rivalries in the United States